The Quikkit Glass Goose is an American two-seat biplane amphibious aircraft, designed by Tom Scott and marketed for homebuilding by Quikkit of Dallas, Texas.

The Glass Goose is based on the earlier Sea Hawker, which was designed by Garry LeGare in 1982 and sold through his firm Aero Gare as the Sea Hawk and, later, Sea Hawker. LeGare sold the rights to the aircraft to Aero Composites in 1986, which sold them again two years later to (unrelated) Aero Composite Technologies.

Design and development
Tom Scott purchased a Sea Hawker kit in October 1984 and completed the aircraft in March 1986, constructing the aircraft according to the plans. He was not happy with the resulting aircraft and over five years incorporated improvements to address performance and stability shortcomings. The final design has more wing area, a larger hull surface and improved pylon aerodynamics, plus many other improvements. This redesign became the Glass Goose kit.

The Glass Goose features a cantilever biplane layout, without interplane struts, a two-seats-in-side-by-side configuration enclosed cockpit under a bubble canopy, retractable tricycle landing gear and a single engine in pusher configuration.

The aircraft is made from composites. Standard engines used are  Lycomings, although the eight-cylinder  Jabiru 5100 and Mazda Wankel engines have also been employed.

Specifications (Glass Goose)

References

External links

Official website archives on Archive.org

Single-engined pusher aircraft
1980s United States civil utility aircraft
Flying boats
Amphibious aircraft
Homebuilt aircraft
Glass Goose
Biplanes